Labeo nigricans is a species of fish in the genus Labeo from the Congo Basin.

References 

Labeo
Fish described in 1911